Amy Mathews (born 29 March 1979) is an Australian television, film and theatre actress.  She is best known for her role as Rachel Armstrong in Australian soap opera Home and Away.

Early life
Mathews was born in Melbourne, Victoria, but has spent most of her life in Sydney. She was offered a scholarship at The University of the Arts in Philadelphia, Pennsylvania, US, which she completed. She then enrolled in and completed a two-year acting course in Surry Hills, Sydney, where she met fellow Home and Away actor Jon Sivewright, who plays Tony Holden, her husband on the show.

Career
Mathews became involved with the Bell Shakespeare Company.  She performed as part of the "Actors at Work" program touring high schools in Australia and Singapore. She has a passion for the theatre, her first role was in 2003 with Cigarettes and Chocolate and Other Hang Ups. Mathews other theatre credits include Tracked, Push Up 1-3, Chicom, Orange Flower Water. She is currently appearing in Transparency.

Mathews made her acting debut on screen in 2001 when she made a guest appearance in the short-lived television series Head Start.  She has had several roles on other television series including Always Greener, Blue Heelers, Love Bytes, All Saints and the British series Jeopardy.  Before landing the role of Rachel Armstrong on Australian soap opera Home and Away, she waited tables until she could make enough money.  Mathews played the role of doctor and psychiatrist Rachel Armstrong since the first episode of the 2006 season, until 2010 when she departed the show. The reason she decided to leave was because she wanted to move on and try new projects. The role of Rachel won Mathews the Logie Award for Most Popular New Female Talent in 2007. Following her departure from Home and Away, Mathews made a guest appearances in two episodes of the popular television series Packed to the Rafters.  Her most recent guest roles include Rescue: Special Ops and Crownies which stars former Home and Away co-stars Todd Lasance and Indiana Evans.

In 2007, Mathews starred in the Australian film Gabriel, in which she had just begun her run on Home and Away while shooting the film.  Gabriel is her only film credit. Since leaving Home and Away, she has starred on stage in various plays, and in t.v commercials.

She has an interest in writing and directing, and she currently runs her own blog, and is studying surface design.

Filmography
{| class="wikitable plainrowheaders sortable"
|-
! scope="col" | Year
! scope="col" | Title
! scope="col" | Role
! class="unsortable" | Notes
|-
| 2001
| Head Start
| Louise
| Season 1 (guest, 1 episode)
|-
| 2002
| Always Greener
| T'ree
| Season 2 (guest, 1 episode)
|-
| 2003
| All Saints
| Mary Cowper
| Season 6 (guest, 1 episode)
|-
| 2003
| Jeopardy| Constable Tucker
| Season 2 (guest, 2 episodes)
|-
| 2004
| Love Bytes| Mel
| Season 1 (recurring, 4 episode)
|-
| 2004
| Blue Heelers| Tahnya West
| Season 11 (guest, 1 episode)
|-
| 2005
| All Saints| Cassie Anderson
| Season 8 (guest, 1 episode)
|-
| 2006–2010
| Home and Away| Rachel Armstrong
| Seasons 19–23 (regular, 331 episodes)
|-
| 2007
| Gabriel| Maggie
| Feature film
|-
| 2010
| Packed to the Rafters| Erin Moore
| Season 3 (guest, 2 episodes)
|-
| 2011
| Rescue: Special Ops| Claire Newell
| Season 3 (guest, 2 episodes)
|-
| 2011
| Crownies| Vanessa Kenay
| Season 1 (guest, 1 episode)
|-
| 2014
| A Place to Call Home| Amy Polson
| Season 2 (recurring, 7 episodes)
|-
| 2018
| Summer of the Seventeenth Doll
| Olive Leech
| Video (theatre performance)
|-
| 2020
| The Heights| Rima
| Season 2 (guest, 1 episode)
|-
| 2020
| I Met a Girl| Senior Constable Harrison
| Feature film
|}

Theatre
 2003: Cigarettes and Chocolate and Other Hang Ups ... Gemma (Darlinghurst Theatre)
 2003: Tracked ... Rose (The Old Fitzroy Theatre)
 2005: Push Up 1-3 ... Sabine 
 2010: Chicom ... Grunt 3 (New Theatre)
 2011: Orange Flower Water ... Cathy Calhoun (Darlinghurst Theatre)
 2011: Transparency'' ... Jessica (Seymour Centre and Riverside Theatre)

References

External links
 Official site
 
 Amy Mathews Biography at RTÉ.ie

1979 births
Australian soap opera actresses
Australian stage actresses
Living people
Logie Award winners
University of the Arts (Philadelphia) alumni